Saranta Ekklisies ( "Forty Churches") is a neighbourhood in Thessaloniki, Greece. It is located next to the Ano Poli.

It was created in the 1920s during the Greek-Turkish population exchange by Greek refugees from the city of Saranta Ekklisies (currently known as Kırklareli) in Eastern Thrace.

The central street was constructed in 1940. Beside the area there was the Jewish cemetery.

Streets 
Kyriakidi Street
Teloglou Street
Vizyinou Street

People 
Dinos Christianopoulos, poet

References

Σαράντα Εκκλησιές
Ο  δρόμος είχε τη δική του ιστορία

Populated places in Thessaloniki (regional unit)